The Battle of Saigon may refer to several battles in the city of Saigon in Vietnam.
French colonization of Vietnam battle
 Siege of Saigon in 1859, leading to the capture of the city by the French Navy
Divided Vietnam and Vietnam War battles
 Battle of Saigon (1955), between the Vietnamese National Army and the Bình Xuyên crime syndicate
 Battle of Saigon (1968), during the Tet Offensive of the Vietnam War
 Fall of Saigon, the end of the Vietnam War in 1975

Other battles in Saigon 
Lê Văn Khôi revolt, against Emperor Minh Mạng, starting in 1833